The 2003–04 EHF Champions League was the 44th edition of Europe's premier club handball tournament.

Qualification stage
{| class="wikitable"  width="700"
|- bgcolor="efefef"
! width="25%" | 
! width="10%" | Agg.
! width="25%" | 
! width="10%" | 1st match
! width="10%" | 2nd match

Group stage

Group A

Group B

Group C

Group D

Group E

Group F

Group G

Group H

Round of 16

Quarterfinals

Semifinals

Finals

External links 
EHF Champions League website

 
EHF Champions League seasons
Champions League
Champions League